The Second Summer of Love was a late 1980s social phenomenon in the United Kingdom which saw the rise of acid house music and unlicensed rave parties. Although primarily referring to the summer of 1988, it lasted into the summer of 1989, when electronic dance music and the prevalence of the drug MDMA fuelled an explosion in youth culture culminating in mass free parties and the era of the rave. The music of this era fused dance beats with a psychedelic, 1960s flavour, and the dance culture drew parallels with the hedonism and freedom of the 1967 Summer of Love in San Francisco. The smiley logo is synonymous with this period in the UK.

History
The Second Summer of Love began in 1988 in UK, and rose from the house music British nightclubs dating from 1987 to 88 Shoom (run by Danny Rampling) and Future (organised by Paul Oakenfold), Trip (run by Nicky Holloway), Slam (DJs) and The Haçienda (run by Mike Pickering and Graeme Park). It was though a cultural happening particularly associated with the quite sudden increase in independent gatherings outdoors in fields and in disused warehouses as well as with the quite new underground club scene, which had often become called raves. Beyond those held around London were also events springing up in areas such as Blackburn and Nottingham, before spreading across all the UK, with very large numbers of distinct gatherings held weekly by late summer of 1988. There were both illegal and legal gatherings in terms of adherence to event planning laws.

While the prime musical point of convergence throughout the phenomenon was house music at first mostly imported from the US underground nightlife centres Chicago, Detroit and New York, also a basis for the scene was focused upon enabling people to open up to other genres of music. This was most typically music not seen as very commercial for the time, including music of the hippie eras and some folk derived music.

These five DJs associated with the early British house music scene reported they were inspired to start these events after holidaying on Ibiza in the summer of 1987 with their friend Johnny Walker. Ibiza was where acid house music first became popular in Europe and the after-hours nature of the club scene emerged.

In the early stages of the Second Summer of Love, the events and parties were often held in empty warehouses across the UK and were essentially illegal. Vague flyers around towns and cities advertised events and information travelled by word of mouth (as well as the newly popular mobile pager) between clubbers who were obliged to party incognito. Increasingly huge parties started to be put on around the M25 orbital of London by promoters including “Biology” (Jarvis Sandy, Micky Jump & Tarquin de Meza), “Energy” (Jeremy Taylor & Tin Tin Chambers), “Genesis (Andrew Pritchard, Wayne Anthony & Keith Brooks), “Sunrise/Back to the Future” (Tony Colston Hayter & Dave Roberts) and “Weekend World” (Tarquin de Meza). In London, events were put on by Raindance, and at Labrynth/Four Aces.

The symbol of the time became a smiley face after the London crowd picked up the design when it was posted on one of the flyers from the third Shoom party. Revellers would soon become adorned in smiley t-shirts and badges.

Water and Lucozade were a common feature because of the dehydrating effects of marathon dancing due to MDMA use. Clubgoers wore baggy clothing to combat the heat inside the clubs, and staff handed out ice pops.

Music
Acid house and hip house was typical of the Second Summer of Love. Acid house was characterised by the "squelching" bass produced by the Roland TB-303 and loud repetitive beats. It originated in Chicago and took on new qualities when it came to Europe. Songs from the time period include "French Kiss" by Lil Louis, "On & On" by Jesse Saunders, "Mystery of Love" by Fingers Inc., "Love Can't Turn Around" by Farley "Jackmaster" Funk & Jesse Saunders (featuring Darryl Pandy), "I've Lost Control" by Sleezy D, and "Your Only Friend" by Phuture. Hip house would become a popular cross-over of a rap and house music, with tracks such as "Turn Up The Bass" by Tyree Cooper, "Who's In the House" by The Beatmasters, "Let It Roll" by Doug Lazy, and "That's How I'm Living" by Tony Scott.

Radio
The raves and music were promoted by pirate radio stations, including Kiss FM, Sunrise and Centreforce.

Drug use
Ecstasy was the drug of choice during the time. LSD was still present, just not as prominently. Mark Moore, of group S'Express, said: "It definitely took ecstasy to change things. People would take their first ecstasy and it was almost as if they were born again." Violence was uncommon due to the feelings of euphoria, love and empathy caused by ecstasy. Ecstasy use in raves is often linked to the reduction in football hooliganism at the time. The drug also increased the enjoyment of the music and encouraged dancing. Nicky Holloway, a DJ from the time, said: "The ecstasy and music came together. It was all part of the package. ... That may sound a little sad, but there's no way acid house would have taken off the way it did without ecstasy."

Media attention
British news media and tabloids devoted an increasing amount of coverage to the hedonistic scene, focusing increasingly on its association with club drugs. Early positive reports such as running articles on the "acid house" fashion would soon become sensationalist negative coverage. The moral panic of the press began in late 1988, when The Sun, which only days earlier on 12 October had promoted acid house as "cool and groovy" while running an offer on acid smiley face t-shirts, abruptly turned on the scene. On October 19, The Sun ran with the headline "Evils of Ecstasy," linking the acid house scene with the newly popular and relatively unknown drug. On 24 June 1989, the newspaper ran its infamous "Spaced Out!" headline after a Sunrise party.

See also 

 Summer of Love (the first, San Francisco, 1967)
 Acid house
 Balearic beat
 Madchester
 House music

References

Further reading
 Wayne Anthony. Class of 88. Virgin Books, 1998. .
 Jane Bussmann. Once in a Lifetime: The Crazy Days of Acid House and Afterwards, Virgin Books, 1998. 
 Simon Reynolds. Energy Flash'. Picador, 1998. 
 Matthew Collin. Altered States: The Story of Ecstasy and Acid House. Serpent's Tail, 1997.
 Sheryl Garratt. Adventures in Wonderland: A Decade Of Club Culture''. Headline, 1999.

Acid house
1988 in the United Kingdom
1989 in the United Kingdom
Madchester
Youth culture in the United Kingdom
History of Manchester